A Manual Dexterity: Soundtrack Volume One is the debut studio album by The Mars Volta guitarist Omar Rodríguez-López, mostly recorded in 2001 at Doug Messenger's Studio and Rodriguez-Lopez's mobile studio after the breakup of former band At the Drive-In. The record was finished at Mad Dog Studios in 2004 and released the same year. This was supposed to be the first volume of a two-part soundtrack set to go along to a film directed by Rodriguez-Lopez.

The release of Volume Two, which was originally planned for Spring of 2005, and the film itself were both delayed indefinitely due to legal problems. Conflicts over ownership of certain footage and Rodríguez-López's reluctance to revisit the project, which featured his late friend Jeremy Ward in the lead role, were both cited as reasons for the delay. However, Rodríguez-López stated that he does intend to release both Volume Two and the film at some point in the future.

"Deus Ex Machina" is a version of a song "Reina de Mi Vida", written by Omar's father Angel Marcelo Rodriguez (also known as Marcelo Rod-Che) for the famous Puerto Rican salsa orchestra El Gran Combo de Puerto Rico; here, it is performed by Angel Marcelo himself.

Track listing

Personnel 

Musicians
Omar Rodríguez-López – guitars, bass, percussion, hand claps, roland promars, SH-1000, SH-101, SH-7, SH-2000, VP-330, Korg MS-2000, microKORG, organ, drum machines, pianette, piano, Yamaha QY-100, rhythm sequence, samples, TVs, telephone, typewriter, breathing
Blake Fleming – drums (1, 2, 5, 8, 10), hand claps (2)
Jeremy Ward – melodica (2), guitar pedals (5), yelling (8)
John Frusciante – mini moog (2, 3), A 100 (3), guitars (5, 10)
Cedric Bixler-Zavala – percussion & hand claps (2), vocals & lyrics (10)
Angel Marcelo Rodriguez – vocals & lyrics (4)
David Lopez – trumpet (4)
Cecilio Ortiz – guitar (4)
Alberto El Professor Aragonez – percussion (4)
Isaiah Ikey Owens – piano (8)
Andrew Scheps – trumpet (8)
Sara Christina Gross – saxophone (9)

Production
Omar Rodríguez-López – production, engineering
Alex Newport – engineering
Jon Debaun – engineering
Andrew Scheps – mixing
Mark Chalecki – mastering

Artwork
Omar Rodríguez-López – photos
Sonny Kay – layout

References 

2004 soundtrack albums
Film soundtracks
Omar Rodríguez-López albums
Gold Standard Laboratories albums
Albums produced by Omar Rodríguez-López